Colonel John Rodolph Slattery (January 31, 1877 – September 24, 1932) was the general manager for the Interborough Rapid Transit Company in New York City.

Biography

He was born in Athens, Ohio on January 31, 1877 to John A. Slattery (1847-1895) and Lena DeSteiguer (1854-1925).  He attended the United States Military Academy and graduated fifth in his class for the year 1900.  He was assigned, as an engineer officer, to work on roads and bridges in the Philippines.  He was assigned to Honolulu in November 1904 as the Honolulu District's first District Engineer for lighthouses.

He married Elizabeth Virginia Bradley (1879-1949) around 1915. He died on September 24, 1932 in Jackson Heights, New York City.

References

1877 births
1932 deaths
United States Military Academy alumni